Eriosphaeria is a genus of fungi in the family Trichosphaeriaceae. Species in this genus are plant pathogens.

Species
As accepted by Species Fungorum;
 Eriosphaeria aggregata 
 Eriosphaeria albidomucosa 
 Eriosphaeria ambigua 
 Eriosphaeria analoga 
 Eriosphaeria atriseda 
 Eriosphaeria australis 
 Eriosphaeria blumenavica 
 Eriosphaeria corylina 
 Eriosphaeria dumetorum 
 Eriosphaeria erysiphoides 
 Eriosphaeria imitatrix 
 Eriosphaeria investans 
 Eriosphaeria membranacea 
 Eriosphaeria oenotria 
 Eriosphaeria raripila 
 Eriosphaeria rehmiana 
 Eriosphaeria rehmii 
 Eriosphaeria robiniae 
 Eriosphaeria scabrosa 
 Eriosphaeria scheremetieffiana 
 Eriosphaeria subtomentosa 
 Eriosphaeria vermicularia 
 Eriosphaeria vulgaris 

Note; some species have been moved from the genus into various families;
 Eriosphaeria alligata , = Herpotrichia alligata; Melanommataceae family
 Eriosphaeria andromedae , = Gibbera andromedae; Venturiaceae
 Eriosphaeria calospora , = Melchioria calospora; Niessliaceae
 Eriosphaeria calospora var. infossa , = Melchioria calospora; Niessliaceae
 Eriosphaeria conoidea , = Lentomitella conoidea; Lentomitellaceae
 Eriosphaeria exigua , = Niesslia exigua; Niessliaceae
 Eriosphaeria herbarum , = Herpotrichia herbarum; Melanommataceae
 Eriosphaeria horridula , = Niesslia horridula; Niessliaceae
 Eriosphaeria inaequalis , = Chaetosphaeria inaequalis; Chaetosphaeriaceae
 Eriosphaeria macrospora , = Wettsteinina macrospora; Dothideomycetes
 Eriosphaeria nigrita , = Crassochaeta nigrita; Chaetosphaerellaceae
 Eriosphaeria nitidula , = Trichosphaeria pilosa; Trichosphaeriaceae
 Eriosphaeria pomiformis , = Melanopsamma pomiformis; Niessliaceae
 Eriosphaeria pulchriseta , = Niesslia pulchriseta; Niessliaceae
 Eriosphaeria sacchari , = Epicoccum sorghinum; Didymellaceae
 Eriosphaeria salisburgensis , = Gibbera salisburgensis; Venturiaceae
 Eriosphaeria vermicularioides , = Chaetosphaeria vermicularioides; Chaetosphaeriaceae

References

Sordariomycetes genera
Trichosphaeriales